Lieutenant Bergerie airport is a military airport in the city of Iquitos, Peru. In the past, it was the commercial airport of that city, but it has since been replaced by Crnl. FAP Francisco Secada Vignetta International Airport.

External links
Aeronautical chart
Direccion General de Aeronautica Civil: lista de aerodromos en el departamento de Loreto

Airports in Peru
Buildings and structures in Loreto Region